Hernán Gustavo Grana (born 12 April 1985) is an Argentine football defender currently playing for Ferro Carril Oeste.

Career
Grana began his playing career in 2003 in the regionalised 3rd division of Argentine football with Platense. In 2006, he was part of the team that won the Apertura 2006 championship.

In 2007, he joined Los Andes but left the club to join All Boys later in the year. Grana won his second B Metropolitana championship with All Boys in 2007-08 helping the team to gain promotion to the 2nd tier.

Following his success at All Boys he was given his chance to play in the Primera División when he was signed by Lanús in 2008. He made his league debut for the club on 28 October 2008 in a 1-0 away defeat to Estudiantes. He has since established himself as a regular member of the first team. In 2012, he was signed by All Boys again on loan after play in Quilmes and Belgrano. Grana was sold to Columbus Crew SC on 23 January 2015 for an undisclosed amount. Grana and Columbus mutually agreed to terminate his contract on 12 May 2015 due to homesickness.

Honours

Platense 
Primera B Metropolitana (1): Torneo Apertura 2006
All Boys
Primera B Metropolitana (1):2007-08

References

External links
 
 
 

1985 births
Living people
People from Quilmes
Argentine footballers
Association football defenders
Club Atlético Los Andes footballers
All Boys footballers
Club Atlético Lanús footballers
Quilmes Atlético Club footballers
Club Atlético Platense footballers
Boca Juniors footballers
Columbus Crew players
Ferro Carril Oeste footballers
FC Dallas players
Argentine Primera División players
Primera Nacional players
Major League Soccer players
Major League Soccer All-Stars
Sportspeople from Buenos Aires Province